Périgot is a surname. Notable people with the surname include:

 Marie-Théodore Périgot (1807–1888), French officer
 Françoise Laurent-Perrigot (born 1950), French politician

French-language surnames